Víctor Andrés Donoso Andalaft (born 27 November 1990) is a Chilean handball player for HK agro Topoľčany in the slovak extraliga and the Chilean national team.

He participated at the 2017 World Men's Handball Championship.

References

1990 births
Living people
Sportspeople from Santiago
Chilean male handball players
Expatriate handball players
Chilean expatriate sportspeople in France
Chilean expatriate sportspeople in Italy
Chilean expatriate sportspeople in Slovakia
Pan American Games medalists in handball
Pan American Games silver medalists for Chile
Handball players at the 2019 Pan American Games
Medalists at the 2019 Pan American Games
20th-century Chilean people
21st-century Chilean people
South American Games silver medalists for Chile
South American Games medalists in handball
Competitors at the 2022 South American Games